Valentín "Tito" M. Eduque (August 26, 1927 – November 8, 2001) was a Filipino basketball coach and player.

He was a member of the 1946 University of Santo Tomas varsity team, among his teammates were Ramon Campos, Jr., Primitivo Martinez, Julian Malonso and Dr. Jose Genato. The Glowing Goldies squad was undefeated in capturing the UAAP crown. Eduque also starred for La Salle and led the Archers to the 1947 NCAA title, his Archer teammates were Eddie Decena, Eddie Sharuff, Jose Mendieta, Jun Inigo, and Jess Pimentel.

Eduque saw action for the YCO Painters under coach Leo Prieto from 1952 to 1957 and then took over as playing coach. In 1964, he led the Philippines at Olympic qualifying tournament in Yokohama in 1964. He won the Asian Basketball Confederation (ABC) as the Philippines' coach in Manila in 1973.

Later known as "the man in white" for his penchant for wearing white clothing, Eduque was married to Inday Vargas, daughter of Jorge B. Vargas. He had five children with Inday. After the death of Inday, he later married Flor Valenzona, with whom he had three children.

In 2000, he was cited, along with coach Baby Dalupan for their contributions to basketball and were given Lifetime Achievement Awards by the National Basketball Hall of Fame whose Executive Director Jose Zubiri hosted the second enshrinement affair at the Peninsula Hotel in Makati.

Eduque died on November 8, 2001.

References

Further reading
Sing No Sad Songs For Tito. The Philippine Star. November 9, 2001

1927 births
Filipino men's basketball coaches
Filipino men's basketball players
Tanduay Rhum Masters coaches
2001 deaths
De La Salle Green Archers basketball players
UST Growling Tigers basketball players
Philippines men's national basketball team coaches
Player-coaches
Manila Beer Brewmasters coaches
De La Salle Green Archers basketball coaches